The District Council of Upper Wakefield was a local government area in South Australia centred on the town of Auburn from 1854 until 1970.

History
The District Council of Upper Wakefield was proclaimed on 19 October 1854 by secession of the Hundred of Upper Wakefield from the District Council of Clare, which had been established in the preceding year.

In 1970 the council amalgamated with the District Council of Saddleworth to form the District Council of Saddleworth and Auburn.

Chairs
Incomplete list:
 Joseph Stear Cole (1854–?)
 
 James English (c1883–?)
 
 J. J. Duncan
 
 J. Robertson (1901–1904)
 J. G. Williams (1904–?)
 E. W. Castine (1907)
 D. Garrett (?–1921)
 G. W. Parker (1922–1923)
 B. H. Roberts (1924–1933) 
 G. W. Williams (1934–1935)

References

Upper Wakefield
1854 establishments in Australia
1970 disestablishments in Australia